"The New Workout Plan" is a song from Kanye West's debut album, The College Dropout. Released in late 2004, the single peaked at #59 on the U.S. Hot R&B/Hip-Hop Songs chart. The music video was released in 2004, with cameos from John Legend, Miri Ben-Ari, Anna Nicole Smith, Fonzworth Bentley, Tracee Ellis Ross, Vida Guerra and GLC. "Work Out" by J. Cole samples the song.

Composition
The lyrics of "The New Workout Plan" are voiced from the point of view of different girls reacting to a fake workout video. West explains unusual "testimonials" from women who have successfully undergone the workout plan and have been able to attain a lavish lifestyle thanks to being in shape.

Critical reception
The song was subject to generally favorable reviews from music critics. Derek Xu of Medium looked at it as being "a satirical anthem, just like "We Don't Care"". Tareck Ghoneim of Contactmusic.com had praise for West's performance: "[he shows] excellent wordplay that is original, humorous and the touch of irony makes for very clever use of lyrics". Paul Cantor of Billboard acknowledged that "Some critics argue that "The New Workout Plan" doesn't fit in with the rest of [The College Dropout]", but praised it as what "should be commended as much for its conceptual ingenuity as its arrangement".

Music video
The official music video was directed by Little X, both short and long versions of the video for the song were officially released in 2004. The video features West in a faux 1980s-era workout video as he instructs women how to transform themselves into housewives. Cameo appearances are included from John Legend, Miri Ben-Ari, Anna Nicole Smith, Fonzworth Bentley, Tracee Ellis Ross, Vida Guerra and GLC. Anna Nicole Smith's cameo sees her playing the role of Ella-May and having a star like her frequently featured in a video of West's went against the idea of so many at the time that he'd fail as a rapper.

Chart performance
The track peaked at #59 on the U.S. Billboard Hot R&B/Hip-Hop Songs chart on November 9, 2004, which was around two months after its release as a single and it spent a total of  21 weeks on the chart.

Legacy
Forrest Wickman of Slate looked at "Highlights" from West's seventh studio album The Life of Pablo (2016) as ending "with another new workout plan", whilst Austin Isaacsohn of Medium wrote of the album two years after its release "Kanye has taken a beating over the years, man. Listen to "The New Workout Plan" off [The College] Dropout, then listen to "Wolves"." Raleigh-based rapper J. Cole sampled "The New Workout Plan" in his 2011 hit single "Work Out", but despite sampling the original, Cole revealed himself to not be a fan of Kanye's songs.

Track listing
CD single
"The New Workout Plan" (Album Version) (Explicit) – 5:22
"Heavy Hitters" (Dirty) – 3:57
"Workout Plan" (Video) (Short Version) – 5:12

Personnel
Information taken from The College Dropout liner notes.
Songwriter: Kanye West
Record producer: Kanye West
Recorder: Keith Slattery, Andrew Dawson, Eugene A. Toale
Mix engineer: Manny Marroquin
Background vocals: John Legend, Sumeke Rainey
Guitar: Eric "E-Bass" Johnson
Piano: Ervin "EP" Pope
Violin: Miri Ben-Ari

Charts

Certifications

Release history

Remix

The official remix for the song was produced by Lil Jon and features a new verse by West and guest appearances from Twista, Luke, and Fonzworth Bentley. The remix was later included on The College Dropout Video Anthology.

References

External links

"The New Workout Plan" Lyrics at MTV (archived from 2007)

2004 singles
2004 songs
Def Jam Recordings singles
Kanye West songs
Music videos directed by Director X
Roc-A-Fella Records singles
Song recordings produced by Kanye West
Songs written by Kanye West
Satirical songs